Ahmed Abdulaziz al-Sadoun (born 1934) is the former Speaker of the Kuwaiti National Assembly. He was previously the speaker from 1985 to 1999, from February 2012 until it was declared that the February 2012 elections were invalid and from October 2022 until it was declared that the March 2022 elections were invalid. He is the leader of the Popular Action Bloc in the Assembly and served for eight terms.

He represented the third district. Al-Sadoun worked in the ministry of communication before being elected to the National Assembly in 1975.

Al-Sadoun is a real estate executive.

Personal Information & Career
He's the youngest of his family born to his father Abdulaziz Jassem al-Sadoun & mother Madhawi al-Rikada he has 12 brothers and sisters. Ahmed AL-Sadoun is Married with six children, two boys (AbdulAziz and Mohammed) and four girls (Widad, Ghada, Shaikha and Dalal). He's one of the founders of Kazma Sporting Club in 1964 and secretary until 1968 and then the president of Kuwait Football Association from 1968 to 1976 and vice president of FIFA from 1974 to 1982

 Home City: Khaldiya, Kuwait
 Religious Views: Muslim - Sunni
 Elected Member since: 1975
 Elected Member for: 12 terms 1975, 1981, 1985, 1992, 1996, 1999, 2003, 2006, 2008, 2009, 2012 and 2022
 Speaker of Kuwait National Assembly: 1985, 1992, 1996, 2012 and 2022
 Political Orientation: Leader of the Takatul al-Nawwab (1992) and of the Popular Action Bloc (1999, 2012)

Allegations of Profiteering
On May 28, 2007, the National Assembly formed an in-house investigation panel to look into allegations that Al-Sadoun and  Mohammed Al-Sager used their influence to make money. The seven-member panel examined claims that Al-Sadoun gave information he garnered from a parliamentary question to his son, helping the company the son worked in to win a business contract.

Oil Reforms
On June 14, 2008, Al-Sadoun and three other MPs filed a bill stipulating that annual oil output from Kuwait should not exceed one percent of proven reserves. The bill also requires the state to disclose to parliament the emirate's actual proven reserves. Al-Sadoun alleges that this number has been inflated to give Kuwait greater leeway within OPEC, which apportions export quotas based on the size of each member country's reserves.
In the past few years, Kuwait has been producing just under one billion barrels per year, one percent of the official reserve figure.

Al-Sadoun further breaks from Kuwait's current oil policies in his staunch opposition to the entry of international oil companies (IOCs) into Kuwait.

Protested Against Israeli Attacks
On December 28, 2008, Kuwaiti lawmakers Mikhled Al-Azmi, Musallam Al-Barrak, Marzouq Al-Ghanim, Jaaman Al-Harbash, Ahmad Al-Mulaifi, Mohammad Hayef Al-Mutairi, Ahmad Al-Saadoun, Nasser Al-Sane, and Waleed Al-Tabtabaie protested in front of the National Assembly building against the attacks by Israel on Gaza.  Protesters burned Israeli flags, waved banners reading, "No to hunger, no to submission" and chanted "Allahu Akbar". Israel launched air strikes against Hamas in the Gaza Strip on December 26 after a six-month ceasefire ended on December 18.

Notes

References

External link

1934 births
Living people
Kuwaiti businesspeople in real estate
Members of the National Assembly (Kuwait)
Speakers of the National Assembly (Kuwait)
Popular Action Bloc politicians